The 2018 Paul Ricard FIA Formula 2 round was a pair of motor races for Formula 2 cars that took place on 23 and 24 June 2018 at the Circuit Paul Ricard in Le Castellet, Provence-Alpes-Côte d'Azur, France as part of the FIA Formula 2 Championship. It was the fifth round of the 2018 FIA Formula 2 Championship and ran in support of the 2018 French Grand Prix.

Classification

Qualifying

Feature race

Notes
 – Roberto Merhi was disqualified for tyre pressure infringement.

Sprint race

Notes
 – Driver did not finish the race, but were classified as they completed more than 90% of the race distance.
 – Ralph Boschung set the fastest lap in the race but because he finished outside the top 10, the two bonus points for fastest lap went to Nyck de Vries as he set the fastest lap inside the top 10 finishers.

Championship standings after the round

Drivers' Championship standings

Teams' Championship standings

References

External links 
 

Le Castellet
Le Castellet
Le Castellet Formula 2 round